Myself World Tour was the third concert tour by Taiwanese singer Jolin Tsai. It started on December 24, 2010, in Taipei, Taiwan at Taipei Arena and continued throughout Asia, Europe, and Oceania before concluding on April 13, 2013, in Kaohsiung, Taiwan at Kaohsiung Arena. It grossed NT$1.5 billion from 35 shows and 600,000 attendance.

Background and development 
On August 13, 2010, Tsai released her eleventh studio album, Myself. On August 26, 2010, she revealed that she would start her new tour around Christmas of the year. On November 6, 2010, she announced that she would embark on her third concert tour Myself World Tour in Taipei, Taiwan at Taipei Arena on December 24, 2010.

Commercial reception 
The ticket sale for the Taipei dates of the tour began on November 6, 2010, and all the tickets were sold out within two days, so it was announced that an additional Taipei show would be held on December 26, 2010. On April 2, 2011, it was revealed that all the tickets of the Hong Kong date on June 24, 2011 were sold out on its first date of sale, so it was announced that an additional Hong Kong show would be held on June 25, 2011. The ticket sale for the Kaohsiung date began on March 16, 2013, and all the tickets were sold out within 18 minutes.

Video release 

On October 19, 2013, Tsai released the live video album Myself World Tour for the tour, which includes the performance of the tour in Taipei, Taiwan at Taipei Arena from December 22 to 23, 2012. It has two editions—standard and limited editions. Warner revealed that some of the tracks included on the album had been authorized copyrights by Tsai’s previous labels, D Sound and Sony, and it became the most completed live video album of her career to this date.

The album peaked at number one on the weekly video album sales charts of Chia Chia, Eslite, Five Music, G-Music, and Pok'elai in Taiwan. In 2013, it reached number three and number one on the 2013 video album sales charts of Kuang Nan and Five Music, respectively.

Set list

Shows

Cancelled dates

Notes

References 

2010 concert tours
2011 concert tours
2012 concert tours
2013 concert tours
Concert tours of Australia
Concert tours of China
Concert tours of Malaysia
Concert tours of Singapore
Concert tours of Taiwan
Concert tours of the United Kingdom
Jolin Tsai concert tours